Klyuchi is a rural locality (a selo) in Usyatsky Selsoviet, Biysky District, Altai Krai, Russia. The population was 227 as of 2013. There are 31 streets.

Geography 
Klyuchi is located 33 km east of Biysk (the district's administrative centre) by road. Stan-Bekhtemir is the nearest rural locality.

References 

Rural localities in Biysky District